The Blue Cafe is the fourteenth studio album by British singer-songwriter Chris Rea, released in 1998. The singles released for the album were "The Blue Cafe", "Thinking of You", "Sweet Summer Day" and "Square Peg, Round Hole". There was also a Japanese version with three bonus tracks, "Kyoto Blue", "Ameno Nakano Kiirono Herumetto" and "On the Beach". It was Rea's sixth successive album to reach the UK Top Ten, peaking at No. 10.

Critical reception 
The Irish Times noted the "menacing atmosphere" evident on the album, "rooted mostly in Rea's sandpaper voice. And the twisted blues lines he plays on guitar". Shadows Of The Big Man is "focused, multifaceted...But best of all is the title song, The Blue Cafe. An album that is bound to be a pure delight for fans of the man."

Track listing 
All songs by Chris Rea.
 "Square Peg, Round Hole" – 3:58
 "Miss Your Kiss" – 4:05
 "Shadows of the Big Man" – 4:49
 "Where Do We Go from Here?" – 4:32
 "Since I Found You" – 4:37
 "Thinking of You" – 3:31
 "As Long as I Have Your Love" – 4:44
 "Anyone Quite Like You" – 4:49
 "Sweet Summer Day" – 4:45
 "Stick by You" – 4:05
 "I'm Still Holding On" – 4:55
 "The Blue Cafe" – 4:49 
 "Kyoto Blue" – 4:44 
 "Ameno Nakano Kiirono Herumetto" – 4:12
 "On the Beach" – 5:03 
Tracks 13, 14 and 15 are bonus tracks on the Japanese edition of the album.

Personnel 
 Chris Rea – vocals, guitars
 Max Middleton – keyboards
 Sylvin Marc – bass
 Martin Ditcham – drums, percussion

Production 
 Chris Rea – producer
 Frédéric Blanc-Garin – engineer
 Ian Cooper – mastering
 Tommy Willis – guitar and amplifier technician
 John Carver – art direction
 Insect – design, artwork
 Brian R. Brown – photography
 Terry O'Neill – cover photography

Charts

Weekly charts

Year-end charts

Certifications

References

1998 albums
Chris Rea albums
East West Records albums